A Select Entry Accelerated Learning (SEAL) program is a form of streaming used in government secondary schools in Victoria, Australia to provide a focused educational environment for academically gifted children.

The program allows students to undertake Year 8 work in Year 7, and the option to complete their secondary education in five years instead of six, or students can choose to undertake a more comprehensive Victorian Certificate of Education that takes three years instead of two.

Victoria currently has four government secondary schools which are entirely selective entry: Melbourne High School, Mac.Robertson Girls' High School, Nossal High School and Suzanne Cory High School, plus a few specialist selective schools: John Monash Science School (which has a science focus), Victorian College of the Arts Secondary School (which specialises in dance, music and visual arts), Maribyrnong Secondary College (with specialist sport programs) and the Flying Fruit Fly Circus School. The University High School also operates a selective science specialist subschool called Elizabeth Blackburn Sciences.

In 2016, the Department of Education stopped accrediting the SEAL program, with a spokesman saying that schools that offer the program should offer enrolment to local students before students outside the school's zoning region.

Controversies 
As a form of streaming, SEAL programs by their very nature attract criticism from those committed to the principles of comprehensive education. Additionally, because they are not offered by every school, the schools that run them are argued to take away the top students from schools that don't, thus leading to a pool of less diverse schools and a concentration of bright students in a small number of schools.

Schools with SEAL programs 
Secondary schools in Victoria offering SEAL programs:
Albert Park College
Auburn High School
Balwyn High School
Bayswater Secondary College
Bellarine Secondary College
Belmont High School
Blackburn High School
Box Hill High School
Brighton Secondary College
Brunswick Secondary College
Chaffey Secondary College
Dandenong High School
Doncaster Secondary College
Emerald Secondary College
Fairhills High School
Gladstone Park Secondary College
Glen Eira College
Gleneagles Secondary College
Horsham College
Kambrya College
Keilor Downs College
Lilydale High School
Lyndale Secondary College
Matthew Flinders Girls Secondary College
McGuire College
Mill Park Secondary College
Mordialloc Secondary College
Mount Clear College
Mount Erin Secondary College
Reservoir High School
Rosebud Secondary College
Sale College
St Albans Secondary College
Springside West Secondary College
Staughton College
Trafalgar High School
University High School
Victoria University Secondary College
Wangaratta High School
Warrnambool College
Werribee Secondary College
Williamstown High School
Wodonga Middle Years College
Wonthaggi Secondary College

References 

Australian educational programs
Education policy
Education in Victoria (Australia)